The 2012 IIHF InLine Hockey World Championship was the 17th IIHF InLine Hockey World Championship, an international inline hockey tournament run by the International Ice Hockey Federation. The World Championship ran alongside the 2012 IIHF InLine Hockey World Championship Division I tournament and took place between 1 and 7 July in Ingolstadt, Germany. The tournament was won by Canada, earning their second World Championship title. Germany finished in second place and Finland third after defeating Slovenia in the bronze medal match. Great Britain were relegated to Division I for 2013 after losing the relegation game against Sweden.

Qualification
Seven of the eight teams automatically qualified for the 2012 IIHF Inline Hockey World Championship while the eighth spot was awarded to the winner of the 2011 IIHF InLine Hockey World Championship Division I tournament. The 2011 Division I tournament was won by Great Britain who defeated Hungary 3–2 in the final.

 − Finished third in the 2011 World Championship
 − Finished first in the 2011 World Championship
 − Finished fifth in the 2011 World Championship
 − Winner of 2011 IIHF InLine Hockey World Championship Division I
 − Finished seventh in the 2011 World Championship
 − Finished sixth in the 2011 World Championship
 − Finished fourth in the 2011 World Championship
 − Finished second in the 2011 World Championship

Seeding and groups
The seeding in the preliminary round was based on the final standings at the 2011 IIHF InLine Hockey World Championship and 2011 IIHF InLine Hockey World Championship Division I. The World Championships groups are named Group A and Group B while the 2012 IIHF InLine Hockey World Championship Division I tournament use Group C and Group D, as both tournaments were held in Ingolstadt, Germany. The teams were grouped accordingly by seeding at the previous year's tournament (in parenthesis is the corresponding seeding):

Group A
 (1)
 (4)
 (5)
 (8)

Group B
 (2)
 (3)
 (6)
 (7)

Preliminary round
Eight participating teams were placed in the following two groups. After playing a round-robin, every team advanced to the Playoff round.

All times are local (UTC+2).

Group A

Group B

Playoff round 
All eight teams advanced into the playoff round and were seeded into the quarterfinals according to their result in the preliminary round. The winning quarterfinalists advanced through to the semifinals, while the losing teams moved through to the placement round. Great Britain was relegated after losing the final placement round game against Sweden, while the United States and Czech Republic finished fifth and sixth respectively after their wins in the placement round. In the semifinals Canada defeated Slovenia and Germany beat Finland, both advancing to the gold medal game. After losing the semifinals Slovenia and Finland played off for the bronze medal with Finland winning 9–4. Canada defeated Germany 9–5 in the gold medal game, earning their second World Championship title.

Quarterfinals
All times are local (UTC+2).

Placement round

Semifinals

Relegation round

Bronze medal game

Gold medal game

See also
2012 IIHF InLine Hockey World Championship Division I

References

External links

IIHF.com

IIHF InLine Hockey World Championship
IIHF InLine Hockey World Championship
IIHF InLine Hockey World Championship
2012 in inline hockey
Sports competitions in Ingolstadt
Inline hockey in Germany